Václav Procházka (born 8 May 1984) is a Czech professional footballer who plays for Fastav Zlín in the Czech First League.

At international level, Procházka played extensively for the Czech Republic youth national teams since the under-15 level. In May 2013 he was called up to the national team.

Career statistics 
As of 30 June 2015

Honours

Club 
 FC Viktoria Plzeň
 Czech First League: 2012–13

References

External links 

 
 

1984 births
Living people
Czech footballers
Czech Republic youth international footballers
Czech Republic under-21 international footballers
Czech expatriate footballers
Czech First League players
Süper Lig players
FC Viktoria Plzeň players
FK Mladá Boleslav players
1. FC Slovácko players
Ankaraspor footballers
FC Fastav Zlín players
Expatriate footballers in Turkey
Association football defenders
FC Baník Ostrava players
People from Rokycany
Czech Republic international footballers
Sportspeople from the Plzeň Region